This is a complete list of school districts in Vermont. Union school districts necessarily overlap (include) other, often town-based or village-based, school districts.

References

 
School districts
Vermont
School districts